The episodes from the anime television series  are based on the Gin Tama manga by Hideaki Sorachi. The series premiered on October 1, 2017. It is a sequel to the Gintama. anime series which aired and ended in 2017.


Episode list

References

. Porori-hen